A chambre de bonne is a type of French apartment consisting of a single room in a middle-class house or apartment building. It is generally found on the top floor and only accessible by a staircase, sometimes a separate "service staircase". Initially, these rooms were intended as the bedroom for one of the family's domestics, and the name originates from the colloquial name for such maids: a "bonne à tout faire". Today, chambres de bonne are usually the cheapest rung on the Parisian letting market, and are primarily rented by less well-off workers and students. They are also in high demand among workers who wish to maintain a small room or postal address in a big city, especially Paris.

Due to the social level of the envisaged occupants, chambres de bonne are characterised by their tight proportions. They tend to offer minimal facilities: toilets are usually shared with the neighbouring rooms, and located on the landing.

Chambres de bonne have nevertheless been the object of legislation to preserve their occupants' quality of life and health.

Since most listings agencies do not recognise a firm distinction between "studios" and "studettes", chambres de bonne may also simply be advertised as studios. Parisian apartment-hunters are, nevertheless, often able to infer that a studio is a chambre de bonne from its listing, due to the distinctive features described above.

References

See also
List of house types
Loi Carrez
Studio apartment
The L-Shaped Room (novel)
Single room occupancy
Bedsit

Real estate in France
Apartment types